Go West, Young Man is a 1936 American comedy film directed by Henry Hathaway and starring Mae West, Warren William, and Randolph Scott. Released by Paramount Pictures and based on the 1934 play Personal Appearance by Lawrence Riley, the film is about a movie star who gets stranded out in the country and trifles with a young man's affections. The phrase "Go West, Young Man" is often attributed to New York Tribune founder Horace Greeley, and often misattributed to Indiana journalist John B. L. Soule, but the latest research shows it to be a paraphrase.

Plot
Mavis Arden (Mae West), is a movie star who gets romantically involved with a politician. She makes plans to meet him at her next tour stop but her Rolls-Royce breaks down and she is left stranded in the middle of a rural town. Her manager arranges for her to stay at a local boarding house. She immediately set her eyes on the young mechanic, fixing her car, Bud Norton, played by Randolph Scott. West sings the Arthur Johnston/John Burke song, I Was Saying to the Moon as she is trying to seduce Scott.

Cast
 Mae West as Mavis Arden
 Warren William as Morgan
 Randolph Scott as Bud Norton
 Alice Brady as Mrs. Struthers
 Elizabeth Patterson as Aunt Kate Barnaby
 Lyle Talbot as Francis X. Harrigan
 Isabel Jewell as Gladys
 Margaret Perry as Joyce Struthers
 Etienne Girardot as Prof. Herbert Rigby
 Maynard Holmes as Clyde
 John Indrisano as Chauffeur
 Alyce Ardell as Jeanette (French maid)
 Nick Stewart as Nicodemus
 Charles Irwin as Master of Ceremonies
 Walter Walker as Andy Kelton
 Raquel Torres Rico's girlfriend

Reception
The New York Times wrote that the film had "lost little" from the play and called the supporting cast "uniformly excellent." Variety wrote that "Miss West, in her own way, is excellent" even though her persona "tires a bit and no longer is quite the novelty it once was." "Excellent Mae West vehicle filled with laughs", reported Film Daily. Motion Picture Daily wrote that "the film is basically farce comedy and, while noticeably different from previous West features, it does not fail to deliver all that is expected." "The play was funny and tough; and the movie is funny, and perhaps tough too", wrote John Mosher in The New Yorker. "We mustn't, of course, ever allow anything to curb Mae West, so it is with relief that we find her in this film no more shy than before." Writing for The Spectator, Graham Greene gave the film a poor review, characterizing it as "quite incredibly tedious", and "as slow and wobbling in its pace as Miss West's famous walk".

References

External links

 

1936 films
1936 comedy films
American comedy films
American black-and-white films
Films directed by Henry Hathaway
Paramount Pictures films
Films with screenplays by Mae West
American films based on plays
Films based on works by American writers
1930s English-language films
1930s American films